The Rules Enabling Act (ch. 651) is an Act of Congress that gave the judicial branch the power to promulgate the Federal Rules of Civil Procedure.  Amendments to the Act allowed for the creation of the Federal Rules of Criminal Procedure and other procedural court rules.  The creation and revision of rules pursuant to the Rules Enabling Act is usually carried out by the Committee on Rules of Practice and Procedure (known as the "Standing Committee") and its advisory committees, which are part of the Judicial Conference of the United States, the policymaking body of the United States federal courts.

The enactment of the Rules Enabling Act on June 19, 1934, was a revolutionary moment in the history of civil procedure in the United States.  The law repealed the archaic "conformity principle" which had governed actions at law (and only actions at law) in U.S. federal courts for over 140 years; namely, the rule that federal courts should conform their procedure in such actions to that of the courts in the state in which they were located.  The conformity principle had caused major problems for federal courts that did not actually sit in the United States, such as the United States Court for China.

While the courts exercised rulemaking powers granted to them under the Act without Congressional intervention for nearly forty years, Congress refused to allow the Federal Rules of Evidence to go into effect after their approval by the Supreme Court in 1973.  The Rules of Evidence were eventually passed, with substantial changes, as legislation by Congress.  Because of Congress's intervention in 1973 and subsequent years, the rulemaking powers granted to the judiciary by the Act have been reduced, causing the Act to command less importance in recent years. However, the Act makes it very difficult for litigants to challenge the constitutional validity of the Federal Rules under the Erie Doctrine.

References

External links 
 Current text of the Act as amended at uscourts.gov
 Creating the Federal Rules at findarticles.com

United States federal judiciary legislation
1934 in law
1934 in the United States